The West Virginia Wing of the Civil Air Patrol (CAP) is the highest echelon of Civil Air Patrol in the state of West Virginia. West Virginia Wing headquarters are located in Charleston, West Virginia. The West Virginia Wing consists of over 600 cadet and adult members at over 12 locations across the state of West Virginia.

Mission
The Civil Air Patrol has three primary missions: providing emergency services; offering cadet programs for youth; and providing aerospace education for CAP members and the general public.

Emergency services
The Civil Air Patrol performs emergency services missions, including search and rescue missions directed by the Air Force Rescue Coordination Center at Tyndall Air Force Base in Florida. Other missions include providing disaster relief, through offering ground and air transport of and an extensive communications network, and the transport of medically time-sensitive materials. The Civil Air Patrol provides Air Force support through the conducting of light transport, communications support, and low-altitude route surveys. The Civil Air Patrol may also assist in counter-drug missions.

Cadet programs
The Civil Air Patrol runs a cadet program for youth aged 12 to 21. The program allows cadets to progress at their own pace through a 16-step program including aerospace education, leadership training, physical fitness and moral leadership.

Aerospace education
The Civil Air Patrol teaches aerospace education to both CAP members and the general public. Teaching includes the providing of training to the members of the CAP, and offering workshops for youth throughout the nation through schools and public aviation events.

Organization

See also
Awards and decorations of the Civil Air Patrol
West Virginia Air National Guard

References

External links
West Virginia Wing Civil Air Patrol official website

Wings of the Civil Air Patrol
Education in West Virginia
Military in West Virginia